The Sumer–Elam war took place in present-day Iran and is considered the first conflict for which evidence exists. Details of this war are slight. Fought between the forces of Sumer and Elam, it occurred around 2,700 or 2,600 BC. The Sumerians had tried to subdue the Elamites, and in response the Elamites fought back. Sumerian sources claim that the Sumerian invaders, possibly led by King of Kish, Enmebaragesi, were victorious. However, Enmebaragesi's identity and dating have been subject to some debate among researchers.

Within a century, the Elamites under the Awan dynasty retaliated and invaded Sumer. Over the next centuries, the two peoples repeatedly went to war.

References

Works cited

3rd-millennium BC conflicts
Early Dynastic Period (Mesopotamia)